P. Marie Thomsen (c.1814 – after 1889) was a pioneering Norwegian photographer who together with Christian Olsen (1813–1898) opened a photographic studio in Christiania (now Oslo) in May 1859. By 1865, she had dissolved her partnership with Olsen. That year she left her studio and her archives to Mimi Frellsen who had earlier served an apprenticeship with her.

References 

1810s births
Photographers from Oslo
19th-century Norwegian photographers
Norwegian women photographers
Year of death unknown
19th-century women photographers